Tibbets (also Kendalls Corner, Tibbet, or Tibbits) is an unincorporated community located in the town of Sugar Creek, Walworth County, Wisconsin, United States. The Sugar Creek Town Hall is in the community.

Notes

Unincorporated communities in Walworth County, Wisconsin
Unincorporated communities in Wisconsin